John Edwin Warner (3 May 1911 – 31 October 1995) was a South African cricket umpire. He stood in two Test matches between 1962 and 1965.

See also
 List of Test cricket umpires

References

1911 births
1995 deaths
Sportspeople from Cape Town
South African Test cricket umpires